Ervis Koçi (born 22 June 1998) is an Albanian professional footballer who plays as a right-back.

Club career

Early career

Dinamo Tirana

International career

Career statistics

Club

References

External links

Ervis Koçi profile FSHF.org

1998 births
Living people
Footballers from Tirana
Albanian footballers
Association football defenders
Albania youth international footballers
Albania under-21 international footballers
FK Dinamo Tirana players
KF Korabi Peshkopi players
KF Luz i Vogël 2008 players
Kategoria e Parë players